Maiestas rugulans (formerly Recilia rugulans) is a species of bug from Cicadellidae family that can be found in South Africa and Eswatini. It was formerly placed within Recilia, but a 2009 revision moved it to Maiestas.

References

Insects of Africa
Maiestas